Ipokia is the metropolitan headquarters of Anago kingdom. It is an ancient kingdom in old Oyo empire. Unlike the other kingdoms, which had at one time or the other engaged in the internecine wars that ravaged Yorubaland in the nineteenth century, Ipokia stood out as an unconquered sanctuary city-state throughout the period.
The year it was founded was not known but can be traced to 13th to 14th century when some prince and princess of Oramiyan, the 6th Ooni of ife and founder of Oyo and Benni kingdom  migrate from Oyo ile  and  settled in Ajase ipo in present-day kwara state due to a little misunderstanding among the prince,then move downward toward west,Lagos with the ancient crown gotten from their forefathers, Oduduwa. settled briefly in Lagos shores,Badagry axis before finally settled down and formed a small town named  Ipokia meaning( people from opo town) with the help and guidance of Ifa Oracle. Ipokia came to be a Local Government in 1996 carved from formally known as"Egbado south local government"but now "Yewa South local government in the west of Ogun State, Nigeria bordering the Republic of Benin. Its Capital is in Ipokia town. It is an exit route from Nigeria to outside world through road and water. It is also regarded as main gate to the gateway state due to its proximity and the boundary between Nigeria and Bennie republic. There are other towns like Idiroko, Oniro, Ita Egbe,Hunbo, Agosasa, Aseko, Maun, Koko, Ropo, Alaari, Tube, Ilashe, Ifonyintedo, Madoga, Ijofin and Tongeji Island in the town of Ipokia at.

It has an area of 629 km2 and a population of 150,426 at the 2006 census.
It the capital of Ipokia Local Government. The current traditional ruler  (King) is Oba Yisa 'Sola Adeniyi Adelakun Olaniyan(JP), The 46th Onipokia of Ipokia kingdom. First class Obas who are in the same category with Alake of Egbas, Awujale of Ijebus, and some other few first class Obas in Ogun State.

Minerals/Natural resources

Ipokia town has large deposits of Kaolin and Red clay. The vast fertile land is available for Agriculture. It is equally rich in soft sand used in the construction industry. Large and commercial deposit of crude oil was discovered in Tongeji Island (a town under Ipokia) by the Federal government of Nigeria.The drilling will take effect soonest by the government and this will provide more revenue for the country and job creation for the beneficial of the indigene .Establishment of oil refinery will soon take effect.

Tourism

A mega tourist city and sea institute was being developed at Whekan Island by the team of Queens Atlantic Resorts Inc., of Las Vegas, Nevada U.S.A. there is room for Boat Regatta, Canoeing and fishing along the Badagry creek. Although the project has since stop due to issue not known. Tongeji Island is a holiday haven with its impressive water front and breathtaking scenery, the island is a beauty to behold. Onigbaale Forest is equally a major tourist attraction. It was reported that the 1st Onigbaale of Ipokia precisely disappeared
there and has since not been seen.

Famous foods

Ipokia cuisine is rich with numerous delicacies original to the Town. Listed below are some of the foods peculiar to the towns and their recipe;

 Gbangba-grinded and farmented corn mill
Imoyo - Pepper, tomato, locust beans, onion, coconut oil, smoked fish, table salt
 Gbon-npete soup - Maize powder, pepper,
meat, oil, salt.
 Atakere - Beans, Pepper, oil, salt.
 Abodo - cassava, salt
 Benju - Cassava, Coconut, salt .
 Ajungun - Maize, Cassava, Oil, Salt &
pepper
 Adalu - Maize, Beans, Salt, Pepper & Oil.
 Atutu(Tutu) - Maize Powder, Beans, Salt, Oil and
Pepper
 Atomboro - Beans, Salt, Pepper and oil.
 Epete-Ewa - Beans Powder, Palm Seed, Salt
and Pepper
 Idoki - Smoke, Fried or Boiled Sweet Potatoes.
 Tuwo(Oka) - Corn Flour
 Eko(Akamu) - Corn
 Asepo - Okra, Smoked Fish, Onion Pepper, Salt, Oil

Languages

The main languages of Ipokia is Anago, Original Yoruba ancient speaking language .

Other languages include; Egun,Eyo and
English language which is Nigeria general language.

Postal information
The postal code of the area is 111.

Towns and villages in Ipokia

 Agada
 Ajegunle
 Aseko
 Ayetoro
 Idiroko
 Ifonyintedo
 Ipokia
 Ita Egbe

 

 Agbologun
 Agosasa
 Ajise
 Aretedo
 Gaun
 Ibatefin
 Idiku
 Idimarun-un
 Idolorisa
 Igbeko
 Igbodoroju
 Igborodo
 Igude
 Igunnu
 Iguu
 Ihunbo
 Ijofin
 Ikate (Igate)
 Ilase
 Ita Onimowo
 Itafa
 Iwuku
 Iyasi
 Madoga
 Maun
 Odepata
 Oniro
 Pagbon
 Tongeji
 Tube
 Whekan

References

Local Government Areas in Ogun State
Benin–Nigeria border crossings
Local Government Areas in Yorubaland